or  is a lake in Senja Municipality in Troms og Finnmark county, Norway. The lake lies in the Helvetesdalen valley on the island of Senja.

See also
 List of lakes in Norway

References

Lenvik
Senja
Lakes of Troms og Finnmark